Ternopil Oblast is subdivided into districts (raions) which are subdivided into territorial communities (hromadas).

Current

On 18 July 2020, the number of districts was reduced to three. These are:

Administrative divisions until 2020

Before 2020, Ternopil Oblast was subdivided into 21 regions: 17 districts (raions) and 4 city municipalities (mis'krada or misto), officially known as territories governed by city councils.

Cities under the oblast's jurisdiction:
Ternopil (Тернопіль), the administrative center of the oblast
Berezhany Municipality 
Cities and towns under the city's jurisdiction:
Berezhany (Бережани)
Chortkiv (Чортків)
Kremenets (Кременець)
Districts (raions):
Berezhany  (Бережанський район)
Borshchiv  (Борщівський район)
Cities and towns under the district's jurisdiction:
Borshchiv (Борщів)
Urban-type settlements under the district's jurisdiction:
Melnytsia-Podilska (Мельниця-Подільська)
Skala-Podilska (Скала-Подільська)
Buchach  (Бучацький район)
Cities and towns under the district's jurisdiction:
Buchach (Бучач)
Urban-type settlements under the district's jurisdiction:
Zolotyi Potik (Золотий Потік)
Chortkiv  (Чортківський район)
Urban-type settlements under the district's jurisdiction:
Zavodske (Заводське)
Husiatyn  (Гусятинський район)
Cities and towns under the district's jurisdiction:
Khorostkiv (Хоростків)
Kopychyntsi (Копичинці)
Urban-type settlements under the district's jurisdiction:
Hrymailiv (Гримайлів)
Husiatyn (Гусятин)
Kozova  (Козівський район)
Urban-type settlements under the district's jurisdiction:
Kozliv (Козлів)
Kozova (Козова)
Kremenets  (Кременецький район)
Cities and towns under the district's jurisdiction:
Pochaiv (Почаїв)
Lanivtsi  (Лановецький район)
Cities and towns under the district's jurisdiction:
Lanivtsi (Ланівці)
Monastyryska  (Монастириський район)
Cities and towns under the district's jurisdiction:
Monastyryska (Монастириська)
Urban-type settlements under the district's jurisdiction:
Koropets (Коропець)
Pidhaitsi  (Підгаєцький район)
Cities and towns under the district's jurisdiction:
Pidhaitsi (Підгайці)
Pidvolochysk  (Підволочиський район)
Cities and towns under the district's jurisdiction:
Skalat (Скалат)
Urban-type settlements under the district's jurisdiction:
Pidvolochysk (Підволочиськ)
Shumsk  (Шумський район)
Cities and towns under the district's jurisdiction:
Shumsk (Шумськ)
Terebovlia  (Теребовлянський район)
Cities and towns under the district's jurisdiction:
Terebovlia (Теребовля)
Urban-type settlements under the district's jurisdiction:
Druzhba (Дружба)
Mykulyntsi (Микулинці)
Ternopil  (Тернопільський район)
Urban-type settlements under the district's jurisdiction:
Velyka Berezovytsia (Велика Березовиця)
Velyki Birky (Великі Бірки)
Zalishchyky  (Заліщицький район)
Cities and towns under the district's jurisdiction:
Zalishchyky (Заліщики)
Urban-type settlements under the district's jurisdiction:
Tovste (Товсте)
Zbarazh  (Збаразький район)
Cities and towns under the district's jurisdiction:
Zbarazh (Збараж)
Urban-type settlements under the district's jurisdiction:
Vyshnivets (Вишнівець)
Zboriv  (Зборівський район)
Cities and towns under the district's jurisdiction:
Zboriv (Зборів)
Urban-type settlements under the district's jurisdiction:
Zaliztsi (Залізці)

References

Ternopil
Ternopil Oblast